The 1921–22 season was the 27th season of competitive football by Southampton, and the club's second in the Football League. After finishing second in the league the previous season, Southampton achieved promotion to the Second Division as champions of the newly regionalised Third Division South. Following a false start to the campaign, the Saints quickly asserted their dominance in the league when they went on a club record 19-game unbeaten run until the end of 1921. The club also remained unbeaten at The Dell for the entirety of the league season, as well as conceding a Football League record low 21 goals in 42 games, which remained in place until the 1978–79 season. Southampton finished atop the league table with 23 wins, 15 draws and four losses, ahead of runners-up Plymouth Argyle only on goal average.

In the 1921–22 FA Cup, Southampton beat Second Division side South Shields to reach the second round, but were knocked out following a replay by recently promoted First Division club Cardiff City, who had also eliminated them in the fourth round the previous year. The club ended the season hosting local rivals Portsmouth in the annual Hampshire Benevolent Cup charity match, which they won 3–1 thanks to two goals from Arthur Dominy and one from Bill Rawlings. Southampton also played four friendly matches during the campaign, beating Portsmouth 4–0 in a benefit game for club secretary and former manager Ernest Arnfield in October, losing 1–0 to Pompey the following month, defeating Preston North End 3–1 in a benefit game for Arthur Dominy in December, and beating amateur side Corinthian in February.

Southampton used 25 different players during the 1921–22 season and had ten different goalscorers. Their top scorer was centre-forward Bill Rawlings, who scored 30 goals in the Third Division South (one behind the division's top scorer, Plymouth's Frank Richardson) and two in the FA Cup. During the season, the club broke their record for highest league win, beating Northampton Town 8–0 at The Dell in December. Eight new players were signed by the club during the campaign, with seven released and sold to other clubs. The average attendance at The Dell during the 1921–22 season was 11,140. The highest attendance was 20,940 against Queens Park Rangers on 27 December 1921; the lowest was around 5,000 for matches against Millwall on 5 January 1922 and against Swansea Town on 20 February 1922.

Background and transfers
Several players left Southampton at the end of the 1920–21 season. Most significant of the departures was inside-left James Moore, who had played every game the previous campaign; he returned to his native county of Yorkshire due to "family reasons", joining Second Division club Leeds United. He was replaced in the side by Henry Johnson, who had joined from Darlaston just before the end of the last season, and new addition Len Andrews, who was signed from Reading in August (he had previously played over 100 games for the Saints before World War I). Goalkeeper Arthur Wood, who had lost his place the previous year to new signing Tommy Allen, also left the club in May 1921 to join Second Division side Clapton Orient, where he remained for the rest of his career. Three more players left in the summer, all of whom had spent only one season at the club – centre-forward George Reader retired from the professional game and joined Harland and Wolff on a part-time basis, outside-right Frank Wright returned to his previous position at Hamstead Colliery, and inside-right George Williams joined fellow Third Division South side Exeter City, where he played for a season before being forced to part-retire due to a leg injury.

In addition to Andrews, Jimmy McIntyre brought in another two new players to Southampton before the start of the 1921–22 season. Full-back Harry Hooper joined for £10 from Brierley Hill Alliance, while centre-forward John Horton was brought in from Wombwell. A few months into the campaign, centre-half Ted Hough was signed from Talbot Stead Tubeworks, who were paid £200 and 52 pints of beer for his services. In January 1922, Sammy Meston – the son of former Southampton half-back Samuel Meston – joined from Sholing Athletic, and outside-right Robert Blyth signed from Portsmouth. In March, the club released two popular players to recently promoted First Division club Birmingham, who provided two of their own players in return. McIntyre's contributions were outside-left Fred Foxall and outside-right Joe Barratt, both of whom had played the majority of games up to that point, while their replacements were inside-left Jack Elkes and half-back George Getgood. Foxall had originally attempted to join top-flight side Aston Villa in May, but his transfer was reversed by the Football Association as Southampton had not given permission for the sale (he was also ordered to donate his signing-on fee to the National War Fund).

Players transferred in

Players transferred out

Players released

Third Division South

Southampton's second Football League campaign began on 27 August 1921 with a home fixture against Gillingham, who had finished bottom of the Third Division table the previous year. The hosts won the game 2–0, with the two top scorers of the last campaign, Arthur Dominy and Bill Rawlings, scoring the goals. Despite this strong start, the Saints were slow to pick up pace in their opening league fixtures, as they were held to a goalless draw at Luton Town and lost 2–0 in the return fixture at Gillingham in their next two games. However, the side's fortunes quickly changed when they embarked on a club record 19-game unbeaten league run, beginning on 5 September with a 2–1 win over Luton at The Dell and not ending until the following January, over four months later. The run produced several high-scoring wins, including a 6–0 victory over Charlton Athletic in November (in which Rawlings scored a hat-trick) and an 8–0 defeat of Northampton Town in December (in which Rawlings scored half of the goals). The result against Northampton Town remained the club's single highest league win until October 2014, when it was equalled with a result of the same scoreline against Sunderland in the Premier League.

The club's unbeaten run finally came to an end on 14 January 1922, when they were beaten by a single goal at mid-table side Brentford. Rawlings scored four goals for a second time during the season the following week when the Saints faced Millwall, making him the first Southampton player to do so three times. However, the club continued to drop points in early 1922, and as a result dropped below main title contenders Plymouth Argyle in the table following a third loss of the season at Swansea Town on 25 February. New signings Jack Elkes and George Getgood debuted against Southend United in the next game, with the former scoring two goals in the convincing 5–2 win; however, he broke his collar bone in the next match, and remained injured for the remainder of the campaign. Southampton dropped valuable points against Argyle in April, when they lost 1–0 at Home Park and were held to a goalless draw at The Dell, with the Devon club pulling five points ahead at the top of the league table.

Despite this points  deficit, Southampton had two games in hand over Plymouth, both of which they won 1–0: first over Newport County on 29 April, and second over Merthyr Town on 1 May. By the start of the final day of the season, Southampton were only one point behind leaders Plymouth Argyle, with a superior goal average. In their final game of the campaign, Southampton thrashed Newport County 5–0 in the return fixture at The Dell, with goals coming from Arthur Dominy (two), Alec Campbell, Rawlings and Henry Johnson. According to club historians, "no-one left The Dell" as the club waited for news from Loftus Road, where Plymouth were playing Queens Park Rangers in their final fixture. Argyle lost the match 2–0, which meant that they were level on points with Southampton, who had a superior goal average to secure them the top spot in the division. According to reports, the fans at The Dell "went wild with excitement, storming the ground, demanding to see the players". The club finished on 61 points from 23 wins, 15 draws and four losses; they conceded 21 goals, which was a record low for a Football League season until Liverpool surpassed it with just 16 goals in the 1978–79 season.

List of match results

Final league table

Results by matchday

FA Cup

Southampton entered the 1921–22 FA Cup in the first round against Second Division side South Shields. Despite their lower league status, the Saints picked up a "convincing" 3–1 win over the second-tier club, with goals from Henry Johnson, Bill Rawlings and Arthur Dominy. In the second round, the club hosted recently promoted First Division side Cardiff City, who had knocked them out in the third round the previous season. The club held the top-flight side to a 1–1 draw at The Dell, but were unable to beat them in the replay at Ninian Park and were eliminated after a 2–0 loss.

Other matches
Outside of the league and the FA Cup, Southampton played five additional first-team matches. The first was a friendly match at home to local rivals Portsmouth on 20 October 1921, which served as a benefit match for club secretary Ernest Arnfield. The Saints won the game 4–0, with all four goals coming in the second half – Arthur Dominy "walked the ball into the net" for the first, John Horton headed in a cross from Fred Foxall for the second, Foxall "completed a solo run" for the third, and Horton scored a second near the end of the game. The two sides met again just over a month later, with Fratton Park hosting a friendly to raise money for the Unemployment District Relief Fund. The game was much more even than the meeting at The Dell, with Percy Cherrett scoring the only goal to give Pompey the win.

In December, the club hosted Preston North End in a benefit match for Arthur Dominy, in which Bill Rawlings scored two and Foxall scored one to give the Saints a 3–1 win. A final friendly took place on 18 February 1922, in which Southampton defeated amateur club Corinthian by a single goal from Sammy Meston. Two days after the conclusion of the Third Division South campaign, Southampton and Portsmouth faced off again (for the fifth time that season) in the annual Hampshire Benevolent Cup fixture. The Saints won the match for only the fourth time in its history (Portsmouth having won it eight times to date, with one ending in a draw), with Dominy (two) and Rawlings scoring in the 3–1 win. Receipts for the match totalled £195, which the Southern Daily Echo described as "rather below the expected returns".

Player details
Southampton manager Jimmy McIntyre used 25 different players during the 1921–22 season, ten of whom scored during the campaign. The team played in a 2–3–5 formation throughout the campaign, with two full-backs, three half-backs, two outside forwards, two inside forwards and a centre-forward. Three players appeared in all 45 league and FA Cup matches: goalkeeper Tommy Allen, right-half Bert Shelley and left-back Fred Titmuss. Inside-right Arthur Dominy played all but one league match during the season, and centre-forward Bill Rawlings appeared in all except four. Rawlings finished as the club's top scorer for the season, with 30 goals in the league and three in the cups, with Dominy's 16 goals across league and cup placing him second. Alec Campbell was the club's highest-scoring half-back of the season with eight league goals.

Squad statistics

Most appearances

Top goalscorers

References

Bibliography

External links
Southampton F.C. official website

Southampton F.C. seasons
Southampton